Amazon Fresh is a subsidiary of the American e-commerce company Amazon in Seattle, Washington. It is a grocery retailer with physical stores and delivery services in most major U.S. cities, as well as some international cities, such as Berlin, Hamburg, London, Milan, Munich, Rome, Tokyo, and some other locations in Singapore and India. In 2020, Amazon Fresh opened several physical stores in the United States and the United Kingdom. The first store opened in the Los Angeles area, followed by the Chicago, Pittsburgh, Philadelphia, Seattle, Washington, D.C., and other areas.

History and business model

Amazon Fresh started in 2007 as an add-on grocery delivery service for Amazon Prime members. 

Amazon Fresh has rolled out its services gradually, targeting specific parts of various metropolitan areas and partnering with local speciality stores for delivery of local items.  The Amazon Fresh website allows potential customers to check availability by postal code.

Under its former name, Amazon Grocery, it sponsored the PBS Kids series Curious George.

In March 2017, Amazon announced the beta launch, on March 29, 2017, of Amazon Fresh Pickup, a drive-in-type grocery store for Amazon Prime subscribers. It is a delivery service that lets users shop online, reserve times to pick up the groceries, and have them loaded into their cars at the store.

In Germany, the product range is 85,000 product lines. By comparison, the REWE supermarket chain's home delivery service has 9,000 product lines.

In the United Kingdom, Amazon signed a deal with the British supermarket chain Morrisons to provide supplies for Amazon Prime Pantry and PrimeFresh.

In July 2017, it was reported that Amazon Fresh was selling meal kits.

On November 2, 2017, Amazon announced it was discontinuing its Fresh service to some smaller towns and cities in California, Delaware, Maryland, New Jersey, New York, and Pennsylvania.

On December 13, 2019, Amazon announced its Fresh service will provide one and two hour delivery of meat, seafood, eggs, and produce in Tampa, Florida.

In 2020, Amazon announced that they are using the name "Amazon Fresh" for their new chain of physical grocery stores in the Los Angeles and Chicago areas. The first Amazon Fresh grocery store opened to the public on September 17, 2020, in the Woodland Hills neighborhood of Los Angeles. On December 10, 2020, Amazon Fresh opened its fifth store and first location outside of California in the Chicago suburb of Naperville.

On March 4, 2021, the first Amazon Fresh store in Europe was opened, in the Ealing Broadway Centre shopping mall in Ealing, West London. The site previously had been occupied by the clothing retailer Monsoon Accessorize.

Amazon Fresh opened their first grocery store in the Washington, D.C. area on May 27, 2021, in the suburb of Franconia, Virginia. On June 17, 2021, Amazon Fresh opened a location in the Seattle suburb of Bellevue using "Just Walk Out" technology which allows customers to skip the checkout line when purchasing their groceries. Amazon Fresh opened their first location in Washington, D.C. in the Logan Circle neighborhood on July 22, 2021; this location uses "Just Walk Out" technology. On August 5, 2021, the first Amazon Fresh grocery store in Pennsylvania opened in the Philadelphia suburb of Warrington.  Two more in  Bensalem & Broomall will follow. In September and November, 2021, it was revealed that an Amazon Fresh grocery store would be opening in Braintree and Saugus, Massachusetts respectively; and one in Billerica, Massachusetts according to a report from June 2022. On August 29, 2022, it was revealed that an Amazon Fresh grocery store would be opening in Leominster, Massachusetts. On November 23, 2022, it was revealed that an Amazon Fresh grocery store would be opening in Westborough, Massachusetts. On December 7, 2022, it was revealed that an Amazon Fresh grocery store would be opening in Plymouth Township, Michigan.

Amazon Fresh announced it will opening up at store in Pittsburgh at Ross Park Mall expected to open in the spring of 2023, the first ever grocery location inside a shopping mall.

On November 17, 2022, it was reported that the development of all upcoming Amazon Fresh grocery stores had been indefinitely paused “pending evaluation of the operation.”

Amazon announced that it would start charging delivery fees on Prime orders under $150, beginning February 28, 2023.

Product lines
Amazon Fresh offers grocery items for sale, as well as a subset of items from the main Amazon.com storefront. Items ordered through Amazon Fresh are available for home delivery on the same day or the next day, depending on the time of the order and the availability of delivery slots.

Amazon Fresh operates independently of Whole Foods, which is also owned by Amazon.  They have separate facilities and separate inventories that they sell.   Market research from Amazon shows that customers at Amazon Fresh tend to have lower incomes and are more likely to be Hispanic or particularly Asian than customers of Whole Foods.

Locations
In the United States in July 2022 Amazon Fresh had 38 locations in the states of California, Illinois, Pennsylvania, Virginia, Maryland, Washington, Washington, D.C., and New York/New Jersey. In June 2022, Amazon Fresh had 17 locations in London, UK. As of September 2022, 2 Amazon Fresh stores have been confirmed as future locations in Roseville and Stockton, California.

Cashierless retail

Dash Carts are shopping carts with a touchscreen, barcode scanner, cameras, and various sensors to automatically count items placed and removed from the cart, allowing customers to skip conventional checkouts. The customer scans a QR code from their Amazon app to link their Amazon account so their purchase can be billed through the payment method linked in their Amazon account. The cart also has a weight sensor to weigh produce priced by weight.

Some Amazon Fresh stores use "grab and go" technology similar to that in Amazon Go stores, which tracks what customers take and place back. It allows customers to skip conventional checkouts while also eliminating the need to use Dash Carts. Currently, there are no Amazon Fresh stores that use both "grab and go" and Dash Carts.

Due to criticism regarding Amazon Go stores not accepting cash, some Amazon Fresh stores also have checkout lanes for customers who want to pay with cash or do not have an Amazon account.

See also

 List of online grocers
 List of supermarket chains in the United States

References

External links

 (US)

Fresh
Online grocers
American companies established in 2007
Retail companies established in 2007
Transport companies established in 2007
Internet properties established in 2007
Companies based in Seattle
Supermarkets of the United States